Freedom of religion in Paraguay is provided in the Constitution of Paraguay, and other laws and policies contributed to the generally free practice of religion. The law at all levels protects this right in full against abuse, either by governmental or private actors. The government generally respects religious freedom in practice; however, it occasionally fails to enforce religious freedom laws when abuses occurred. There were some reports of societal abuses or discrimination based on religious affiliation, belief, or practice; however, prominent societal leaders took positive steps to promote religious freedom.

Religious demography

The country has an area of 406,752 square kilometres and a population of 6.3 million. According to the 2002 national census, 89.6 percent of the population is Roman Catholic, and 6.2 percent is evangelical Protestant. Groups that constitute less than 5 percent of the population include Jehovah's Witnesses, Jews (Orthodox, Conservative, and Reform), The Church of Jesus Christ of Latter-day Saints (Mormons), Mennonites, Muslims, and Baháʼís. A 2006 survey indicates similar results; however, 84.7 percent of respondents consider themselves Catholic, a decrease from 2002.

Native-born citizens tend to be Catholic, while immigrants generally belong to other religious groups. The eastern department of Alto Parana has a large Muslim community due to substantial immigration from the Middle East, particularly Lebanon. A large Mennonite community flourishes in the western department of Boquerón. Members of other religious groups are concentrated in the largest cities, including Asunción, Ciudad del Este, and Encarnación. Non-Catholic immigrant groups tend to have a higher per capita income than the primarily Catholic, native-born citizens. Membership in religious groups is high.

Legal/policy framework
The Constitution protects Paraguayans' right to freedom of religion. It and other laws prohibit discrimination on the basis of religion and impose few legal restrictions on religious expression or speech. The Constitution and other laws also protect the right of individuals to choose, change, and freely practice their religion; provide legal protections covering discrimination and persecution; and offer remedies for the violation of religious freedom.

The Constitution recognizes the historical role of the Catholic Church (the dominant religion). Although the government is secular in name and practice, most government officials are Catholic, and Catholic clergy occasionally speak during official government events. There have been several senior officials who were Mennonites. Former President Fernando Lugo was a retired Catholic bishop, and a member of the Christian Democratic Party, a Catholic party.

The government observes Maundy (Holy) Thursday, Good Friday, the Assumption of the Blessed Virgin Mary, Virgin of Caacupé Day, and Christmas as national holidays.

The Constitution provides for conscientious objection to military service. The armed forces have an extensive Catholic chaplain program supported by the government. The Catholic Church considers this chaplaincy to be a diocese and appoints a bishop to oversee the program on a full-time basis.

Although the Government does not place restrictions on religious publishing or other religious media, such publications are subject to libel law. The law does not prohibit, restrict, or punish the importation, possession, or distribution of religious literature, clothing, or symbols.

All churches and religious organizations are required to register with the Ministry of Education and Culture. Registration includes completing required paperwork, obtaining certification as a nonprofit organization, passing financial and criminal background checks, and paying a small fee. The government imposes few controls on religious groups, and many remain unregistered, typically evangelical churches with few members. The government does not place restrictions on foreign missionaries; however, the process to obtain temporary or permanent residency is opaque and requires applicants, including missionaries, to pay fees in excess of $100 (400,000 guaraníes) per transaction and spend months or even years to obtain residency.

The government permits, but does not require religious instruction in public schools. Parents are permitted to homeschool or send their children to the school of their choice without sanction or restriction.

Restrictions on and abuses of religious freedom

President Duarte and some of his supporters promoted intolerance toward the Catholic Church during the 2007-2008 presidential election campaign. In 2007 then-President Duarte made several discriminatory remarks against the Catholic clergy in an attempt to discredit candidate Fernando Lugo, a resigned Catholic bishop, who won the election.

Jehovah's Witnesses who refused to give permission for blood transfusions reported that authorities challenged their "right to bodily self-determination." In January 2007 police in Horqueta, Concepción Department, arrested Jehovah's Witness Pastor Juan Gill and four members of his congregation for refusing to authorize a blood transfusion for Gill's son, Magno Gill Bazan. In June 2007 a court found them innocent. In September 2007 police arrested Jehovah's Witnesses José Ortega and Asunción Bernarda Ortega Gaona for refusing to allow doctors to give their daughter blood transfusions. Doctors at the hospital administered the blood transfusion after obtaining a court order. Ten days after their arrest, the Ortegas were released from prison on bail; their case remained under investigation at the end of the period covered by this report.

Thereafter, the Government granted the Church access to its remaining land holdings, and the Church remains active in the country.

There are no reports of religious prisoners or detainees in the Paraguay.

The government generally takes steps to promote tolerance for religions or religious beliefs. On April 23, 2008, the government opened an investigation against anti-Semitic and pro-Nazi activist Ramon Dardo Casteluccio for threatening violence against members of a local human rights nongovernmental organization (NGO).

Societal abuses and discrimination

There were some reports of societal abuses or discrimination based on religious affiliation, belief, or practice; however, prominent societal leaders took positive steps to promote religious freedom. The government investigated these cases but lacked adequate resources to resolve them.

Anti-Semitic and pro-Nazi messages and symbols, including graffiti, appear sporadically. The government investigated but did not identify suspects. In July 2007 the newspaper ABC Color published an anti-Semitic article. Representatives of B'nai B'rith met with the publisher to express their concern.

On November 9, 2007, then-presidential candidates Fernando Lugo and Lino Oviedo attended a memorial event honoring Jews persecuted and killed in 1938 by the Nazis on the Night of Broken Glass (Kristallnacht). The government permitted an interfaith NGO to host a memorial event on September 11, 2007, at the National Congress.

References

Paraguay
Religion in Paraguay